Ostorhinchus is a genus of ray-finned fish in the family Apogonidae native to the Indian and Pacific Oceans.

Etymology
The etymology of the word Ostorhinchus is Greek, with Ostor- stemming from ὀστέον (bone), and -rhinchus stemming from ῥῠ́γχος (Ancient Greek) or ρύγχος (Modern Greek), the meaning of which can be beak. The latter refers to the genus' advanced boned jaw.

Species
The 93 recognized species in this genus are:
 O. angustatus (H. M. Smith & Radcliffe, 1911), broad-striped cardinalfish
 O. aphanes (T. H. Fraser, 2012)
 O. apogonoides (Bleeker, 1856), short-tooth cardinalfish or goldbelly cardinalfish
 O. aroubiensis (Hombron & Jacquinot, 1853)
 O. aterrimus (Günther, 1867)
 O. atrogaster (H. M. Smith & Radcliffe, 1912), black-belly cardinalfish
 O. aureus (Lacépède, 1802), ring-tailed cardinalfish
 O. brevispinis (T. H. Fraser & J. E. Randall, 2003)
 O. bryx (T. H. Fraser, 1998), offshore cardinalfish
 O. capricornis (G. R. Allen & J. E. Randall, 1993), Capricorn cardinalfish
 O. cavitensis (D. S. Jordan & Seale, 1907), white-line cardinalfish
 O. chalcius (T. H. Fraser & J. E. Randall, 1986)
 O. cheni (Hayashi, 1990)
 O. chrysopomus (Bleeker, 1854), spotted-gill cardinalfish
 O. chrysotaenia (Bleeker, 1851), yellow-lined cardinalfish
 O. cladophilos (G. R. Allen & J. E. Randall, 2002), shelter cardinalfish
 O. compressus (H. M. Smith & Radcliffe, 1911), ochre-striped cardinalfish
 O. cookii (W. J. Macleay, 1881), Cook's cardinalfish
 O. cyanosoma (Bleeker, 1853), yellow-striped cardinalfish
 O. cyanotaenia (Bleeker, 1853)
 O. dispar (T. H. Fraser & J. E. Randall, 1976), red-spot cardinalfish
 O. diversus (H. M. Smith & Radcliffe, 1912)
 O. doederleini (D. S. Jordan & Snyder, 1901), Doederlein's cardinalfish
 O. endekataenia (Bleeker, 1852), candy-stripe cardinalfish
 O. fasciatus (G. Shaw, 1790), broad-banded cardinalfish
 O. flagelliferus (J. L. B. Smith, 1961), coachwhip cardinalfish
 O. flavus (G. R. Allen & J. E. Randall, 1993), brassy cardinalfish
 O. fleurieu Lacépède, 1802, flower cardinalfish
 O. franssedai (G. R. Allen, Kuiter & J. E. Randall, 1994), Frans' cardinalfish
 O. fukuii (Hayashi, 1990)
 O. griffini (Seale, 1910), hook-fin cardinalfish
 O. gularis (T. H. Fraser & Lachner, 1984), gular cardinalfish
 O. hartzfeldii (Bleeker, 1852), Hartzfeld's cardinalfish
 O. hoevenii (Bleeker, 1854), frost-fin cardinalfish
 O. holotaenia (Regan, 1905), copper-striped cardinalfish
 O. ishigakiensis (H. Ida & Moyer, 1974)
 O. jenkinsi (Evermann & Seale, 1907)
 O. kiensis (D. S. Jordan & Snyder, 1901), rifle cardinalfish
 O. komodoensis (G. R. Allen, 1998), komodo cardinalfish
 O. leptofasciatus (G. R. Allen, 2001), slender-line cardinalfish
 O. leslie (J. K. Schultz & J. E. Randall, 2006), Leslie's cardinalfish
 O. limenus (J. E. Randall & Hoese, 1988), Sydney cardinalfish
 O. lineomaculatus (G. R. Allen & J. E. Randall, 2002), line-spot cardinalfish
 O. luteus (J. E. Randall & Kulbicki, 1998) (yellow cardinalfish)
 O. maculiferus (A. Garrett, 1864) (spotted cardinalfish)
 O. magnifica (Seale, 1910)
 O. margaritophorus (Bleeker, 1855) (red-striped cardinalfish)
 O. melanoproctus (T. H. Fraser & J. E. Randall, 1976), black-vent cardinalfish
 O. melanopterus (Fowler & B. A. Bean, 1930)
 O. microspilos (G. R. Allen & J. E. Randall, 2002), micro-spot cardinalfish
 O. moluccensis (Valenciennes, 1832), Moluccan cardinalfish
 O. monospilus (T. H. Fraser, J. E. Randall & G. R. Allen, 2002)
 O. multilineatus (Bleeker, 1874), many-lined cardinalfish
 O. mydrus (D. S. Jordan & Seale, 1905)
 O. nanus (G. R. Allen, Kuiter & J. E. Randall, 1994), tiny cardinalfish
 O. neotes (G. R. Allen, Kuiter & J. E. Randall, 1994), Mini cardinalfish
 O. nigricans (F. Day, 1875)
 O. nigripes (Playfair, 1867), black-foot cardinalfish
 O. nigrocinctus (H. M. Smith & Radcliffe, 1912), black-belt cardinalfish
 O. nigrofasciatus (Lachner, 1953), black-stripe cardinalfish
 O. norfolcensis (J. D. Ogilby, 1888), Norfolk cardinalfish
 O. notatus (Houttuyn, 1782), spot-nape cardinalfish
 O. noumeae (Whitley, 1958)
 O. novemfasciatus (G. Cuvier, 1828), seven-striped cardinalfish
 O. ocellicaudus (G. R. Allen, Kuiter & J. E. Randall, 1994), tail-eye cardinalfish
 O. oxina (T. H. Fraser, 1999)
 O. oxygrammus (G. R. Allen, 2001), sharp-line cardinalfish
 O. pallidofasciatus (G. R. Allen, 1987), pale-striped cardinalfish
 O. pallidus (G. R. Allen & Erdmann, 2017) 
 O. parvulus (H. M. Smith & Radcliffe, 1912)
 O. pleuron (T. H. Fraser, 2005), Rib-bar cardinalfish
 O. popur (Montrouzier, 1857)
 O. properuptus (Whitley, 1964), southern orange-lined cardinalfish
 O. pselion (J. E. Randall, T. H. Fraser & Lachner, 1990)
 O. quinquestriatus (Regan, 1908)
 O. radcliffei (Fowler, 1918)
 O. regula (T. H. Fraser & J. E. Randall, 2003)
 O. relativus (J. E. Randall, 2001)
 O. rubrimacula (J. E. Randall & Kulbicki, 1998), ruby-spot cardinalfish
 O. rueppellii (Günther, 1859), western gobbleguts
 O. schlegeli (Bleeker, 1855), Schlegel's cardinalfish
 O. sealei (Fowler, 1918), Seale's cardinalfish
 O. selas (J. E. Randall & Hayashi, 1990), meteor cardinalfish
 O. semilineatus (Temminck & Schlegel, 1843), half-lined cardinalfish
 O. septemstriatus (Günther, 1880), seven-band cardinalfish
 O. sinus (J. E. Randall, 2001)
 O. spilurus (Regan, 1905)
 O. taeniophorus (Regan, 1908), reef-flat cardinalfish
 O. unitaeniatus (G. R. Allen, 1995)
 O. urostigmus (Bleeker, 1874)
 O. victoriae (Günther, 1859), western striped cardinalfish
 O. wassinki (Bleeker, 1861), Kupang cardinalfish
 O. wilsoni (Fowler, 1918)

References

 
Apogoninae
Marine fish genera
Taxa named by Bernard Germain de Lacépède